This article lists the latest women's squads lists for badminton's 2020 European Men's and Women's Team Badminton Championships. Ranking stated are based on world ranking date for 21 January 2020 as per tournament's prospectus.

Group 1
Group 1 consists of Denmark, 
Estonia, 
Ireland, 
and Netherlands.

Denmark

Estonia

Ireland

Netherlands

Group 2
Group 2 consists of Russia, 
Belgium, 
Iceland, 
and Lithuania.

Russia

Belgium

Iceland

Lithuania

Group 3
Group 3 consists of France, 
Belarus, 
England, 
and Israel.

France

Belarus

England

Israel

Group 4
Group 4 consists of Germany, 
Latvia, 
Portugal, 
and Slovakia.

Germany

Latvia

Portugal

Slovakia

Group 5
Group 5 consists of Bulgaria, 
Hungary, 
Ukraine, 
and Wales.

Bulgaria

Hungary

Ukraine

Wales

Group 6
Group 6 consists of Turkey, 
Czech Republic, 
Finland, 
and Slovenia.

Turkey

Czech Republic

Finland

Slovenia

Group 7
Group 7 consists of Spain, 
Norway, 
Poland, 
Scotland, 
and Sweden.

Spain

Norway

Poland

Scotland

Sweden

References

2020 European Men's and Women's Team Badminton Championships